Courville may refer to:

a surname:
Cindy Courville (contemporary), U.S. Ambassador to the African Union
Joachim Thibault de Courville (died 1581), French composer, singer, and musician of the Renaissance
Larry Courville (born 1975), Canadian professional ice hockey player
David Courville (born 1951), Native to Detroit Michigan, Mechanical Engineer. 
Vince Courville (born 1959), American football player

other:
Courville, Marne, a commune in northeastern France